Jan Hamřík (born 3 December 1940) is a Czech luger. He competed at the 1964 Winter Olympics and the 1968 Winter Olympics.

References

1940 births
Living people
Czech male lugers
Olympic lugers of Czechoslovakia
Lugers at the 1964 Winter Olympics
Lugers at the 1968 Winter Olympics
Sportspeople from Prague